Alastair David William Fothergill  (born 10 April 1960) is a British producer of nature documentaries for television and cinema. He is the series producer of the series The Blue Planet (2001), Planet Earth (2006) and the co-director of the associated feature films Deep Blue and Earth.

Early life and education 
Born in London, Fothergill attended Orley Farm School and Harrow School. He studied zoology at St Cuthbert's Society, Durham at Durham University and made his first film, On the Okavango, while still a student.

Career 
Fothergill joined the BBC Natural History Unit in 1983, working on The Really Wild Show, Wildlife on One and David Attenborough's The Trials of Life. He was appointed head of the Unit in 1992, and during his tenure he produced Attenborough's award-winning series Life in the Freezer.

He was awarded the Royal Geographical Society's Cherry Kearton Medal and Award in 1996.

In June 1998, he stood down as head of the Natural History Unit to concentrate on his work as series producer on the multi-award-winning The Blue Planet. In 2006 he completed his next major series Planet Earth, which won the Cinema for Peace Clean Energy Award at the Cinema for Peace Gala Berlin in 2008.

More recently he was executive producer of Frozen Planet (2011) and The Hunt (2015).

He has also presented several television programmes, including The Abyss and is the author of three books.

In 2008, he signed a multi-picture deal with newly formed Disneynature, and now spends six months each year on sabbatical from the BBC developing feature documentaries as an independent producer. The first few titles under the Disneynature deal had been, for now, African Cats (2011), Chimpanzee (2012), Bears (2014), Penguins (2019), Dolphin Reef (2020), and Polar Bear (2022) co-directed with Keith Scholey, Mark Linfield, and Jeff Wilson.

In 2016, Fothergill was made a Fellow of the Royal Television Society for his work in natural history programming. He was appointed Officer of the Order of the British Empire (OBE) in the 2019 Birthday Honours for services to film.

Personal life 
Fothergill lives in Bristol with his wife Melinda (née Barker) and two sons, Hamish and William.

Film and television credits
 The Really Wild Show (1986) – producer
 Wild Britain (1987) – producer
 Reefwatch (1988) – associate producer
 Wildlife on One (1988–92) – producer
 The Trials of Life (1990) – assistant producer
 Life in the Freezer (1993) –series producer
 Natural World, episode "South Georgia: An Island All Alone" (1998) – producer
 The Blue Planet (2001) – series producer
 Going Ape (2002) – presenter (with Saba Douglas-Hamilton)
 The Abyss – Live (2002–2003) – executive dog and presenter (with Michael deGruy, Kate Humble and Peter Snow)
 Deep Blue (2003) – writer and director (with Andy Byatt)
 Planet Earth (2006) – series producer
 Earth (2006) – writer and director (with Mark Linfield)
 Frozen Planet (2011) – executive producer
 African Cats (2011) – writer and director (with Keith Scholey)
 Chimpanzee (2012) – writer and director (with Mark Linfield)
 Bears (2021) - director (with Keith Scholey)
 The Hunt (2015) – executive producer
 Our Planet (2019) - executive producer
 Penguins (2019) – director (with Jeff Wilson)
 Polar Bear (2022) – director (with Jeff Wilson)
 Dolphin Reef (2013) - director (with Keith Scholey)
 David Attenborough: A Life On Our Planet (2020) - executive producer

References

External links
 

1960 births
British television producers
Alumni of St Cuthbert's Society, Durham
Living people
People educated at Harrow School
Fellows of the Royal Television Society
Officers of the Order of the British Empire
Recipients of the Royal Geographical Society Patron's Medal